Adam Zindani (born 5 March 1972) is an English rhythm guitarist for the Welsh-based rock group Stereophonics, and the lead vocalist and rhythm guitarist for the Birmingham-based band Casino. His debut solo single, "What About Love", is due to be released 14 October 2022, and his debut album, Black Eyes Blue, is set to be released 24 March 2023.

Casino
The band were signed to Polydor Records in 2006 and changed their name to SpiderSimpson, after a character from a cult film. They recorded what was then going to be their debut album at Studio 606 in Los Angeles with record producer Nick Raskulinecz. The band were not happy with the original track order of the album, and saw the recording rejected by Polydor.

In the autumn 2006 they completed the Kerrang! Radio Breakthrough Tour with other newly signed bands, followed by a UK tour in December. But in 2007, Zindani became involved with touring with Stereophonics as their live guitarist. Then in 2008, the future of Casino was put in doubt when Zindani was made a permanent member of Stereophonics. In May 2011 Adam announced on Kerrang! Radio that the band signed a record deal and they were going to release an album. This turned out to be 2009s “The Spider Simpson Incident” and was a re-recording of their rejected album, with added new songs. Since then they have done several gigs in Birmingham and London in between Stereophonics gigs. In late 2012 two singles were released, 'Runaway' and 'Rise and Fall', followed by the release of album 'Heavy Fever'.

Stereophonics
On 20 May 2007, at BBC Radio 1's Big Weekend in Preston, Zindani joined Stereophonics on stage. Zindani continued to tour with the band for the remainder of the Pull the Pin tour, playing lead guitar and backing vocals. He was credited for writing and performing on two of the band's tracks, "You're My Star" and "My Own Worst Enemy". On "You're My Star", he sang backing vocals and played lead guitar, whereas, on "My Own Worst Enemy", he only played lead guitar. He was made an official member of the band leaving the future of Casino hanging in the balance. Casino's debut album was funded by the money Zindani made touring with Stereophonics.

With the group he has recorded the albums Keep Calm and Carry On in 2009, Graffiti on the Train in 2013, Keep the Village Alive in 2015, Scream Above the Sounds in 2017, Kind in 2019 and Oochya in 2022.

Personal life
Zindani still lives in Birmingham, while other members of Stereophonics have all moved to London. Not much is known of his personal life but in Stereophonics interviews he has mentioned his children. He has also appeared on Soccer AM with fellow Stereophonics member Kelly Jones.

Adam is a Birmingham City F.C fan. Adam attended St Bernard's Roman Catholic Primary School in Moseley before moving to Kings Heath and entering Baverstock School, Druids Heath, Birmingham. He was a keen snooker player, going to his local club in Kings Heath. He didn't start to play the guitar until after his 16th birthday.

References

1972 births
Living people
English rock guitarists
People from Birmingham, West Midlands
English people of Moroccan descent
21st-century British guitarists